Damgheh may refer to:
 Damgheh-ye Bozorg
 Damgheh-ye Kuchek